Kosovo is a village in Medynsky District of Kaluga Oblast, Russia.

Rural localities in Kaluga Oblast